Luo language or Lwo language may refer to:

 Luo languages, a family of Nilotic languages spoken by the Luo peoples from southern Sudan to southern Kenya
 Luo dialect or Dholuo, a dialect of the Luo group of Nilotic languages
 Luo language (Cameroon), an unclassified language spoken in the Atta region of Cameroon
 Luwo language, a Nilotic language spoken by the Luwo people in South Sudan

See also
 Southern Luo language, a dialect cluster of Uganda and neighboring countries
 Luo people, an ethnic group native to western Kenya and northern Tanzania
 Luo peoples, several  Nilotic ethnic groups that inhabit an area ranging from Egypt and Sudan to Kenya and Tanzania
 Luo script, an alphabet invented c. 2021 to write Luo languages
 Luo (disambiguation)
 LWO (disambiguation)
 Lua language (disambiguation)